Dugesia (pronounced, /duˈd͡ʒiʒ(i)ə/) is a genus of dugesiid triclads that contains some common representatives of the class Turbellaria. These common flatworms are found in freshwater habitats of Africa, Eurasia, and Australia. Dugesia is best known to non-specialists because of its regeneration capacities.

Dugesia is the type genus of the family Dugesiidae.

Description
Dugesia species have an elongated body with a slightly triangle-shaped head. Usually they have grey, brown or black colors on the dorsal body surface, the ventral surface uses to be paler. These animals have a couple of eyes constituted by a multicellular pigmented cup with many retinal cells to detect the amount of light in the nearby environment. Sometimes they present supernumerary eyes. At the anterior part of the body, behind the eyes level, they have two of structures called auricles that give the triangle look to the 'head' and that allow them to detect the intensity of water current. These auricles are free of pigment and rhabdites. Each side of the anterior margin of the head have between 5 and 10 shallow sensory fossae, their number depends on the species or the individual. The sensory fossae and the auricle grooves are supplied with many nerve endings.

Dugesia digestion tract consists of a central non-pigmented tubular pharynx. Like the other triclads, Dugesia'''s gut consists in three ramified branches. Each branch consists of ceca, which delivers the nutrients to the body.  This worm has a sac digestive plan, that is, it does not have a separate opening for waste excretion.

Subepidermal musculature is divided in four layers.

In Dugesia the ovaries are ventrally situated, they start just behind the brain, usually at the level of the fourth intestinal branch. The bursal canal runs on the right side of the copulatory apparatus and above the atrium. Like some Neppia species, Dugesia have a third layer of longitudinal musculature over the vaginal area of the bursal canal. This feature is not present in other triclads. Another feature shared with Neppia is the presence of a glandular area at the transicional area between the seminal vesicle and the ejaculatory duct, although in Dugesia these glands are concentrated at the diaphragm, a structure not present in any other genera. Ball proposed that the presence of this glands was a synapomorphy of Dugesia and Neppia. The absence of these glands in some Neppia species (N. jeanneli, N. montana and N. schubarti) is thought to be a secondary loss.

Reproduction
They are hermaphrodites. Many species can reproduce both sexually and asexually (by parthenogenesis or by fission).

Phylogeny and taxonomyDugesia species have not enough morphological characters to find out which are the relationships between them. Furthermore, those available use to contradict each other. Dugesia species are identified by the combination of diagnostic characters instead of different apomorphies. Over 70 species within the genus Dugesia have been described.

Phylogeny

Phylogenetic tree including five dugesiid genera after Álvarez-Presas et al., 2008:

Molecular phylogeny of 13 Dugesia species after Lázaro et al., 2009:

Molecular phylogeny of Dugesia species after Solà et al., 2013:

Species
The following species are currently recognised in the genus Dugesia:
 Dugesia absoloni Dugesia adunca Dugesia aenigma Dugesia aethiopica Dugesia afromontana Dugesia andamanensis Dugesia annandalei Dugesia arabica Dugesia arcadia Dugesia ariadnae Dugesia artesiana Dugesia astrocheta Dugesia aurea Dugesia austroasiatica Dugesia bactriana Dugesia bakurianica Dugesia batuensis Dugesia benazzii Dugesia bengalensis Dugesia biblica Dugesia bifida Dugesia bijuga Dugesia borneana Dugesia brachycephala Dugesia brigantii Dugesia burmaensis Dugesia capensis Dugesia chichkovi Dugesia circumcisa Dugesia constrictiva Dugesia corbata Dugesia cretica Dugesia damoae Dugesia debeauchampi Dugesia deharvengi Dugesia didiaphragma Dugesia dubia Dugesia ectophysa Dugesia elegans Dugesia etrusca Dugesia fissipara Dugesia foeni Dugesia fontinalis Dugesia gemmulata Dugesia golanica Dugesia gonocephala Dugesia gonocephaloides Dugesia hepta Dugesia hoernesi Dugesia hymanae Dugesia iheringii Dugesia ilvana Dugesia indica Dugesia indonesiana Dugesia iranica Dugesia izuensis Dugesia japonica Dugesia krishnaswamyi Dugesia lamottei Dugesia lanzai Dugesia lata Dugesia laurentiana Dugesia leclerci Dugesia leporii Dugesia libanica Dugesia liguriensis Dugesia lindbergi Dugesia machadoi Dugesia maculata Dugesia maghrebiana Dugesia majuscula Dugesia malickyi Dugesia mertoni Dugesia michaelsoni Dugesia microbursalis Dugesia milloti Dugesia minotauros Dugesia mirabilis Dugesia modesta Dugesia monomyoda Dugesia montana Dugesia myopa Dugesia nannophallus Dugesia nansheae Dugesia neumanni Dugesia nonatoi Dugesia notogaea Dugesia novaguineana Dugesia polyorchis Dugesia precaucasica Dugesia pustulata Dugesia rincona Dugesia ryukyuensis Dugesia sagitta Dugesia schauinslandi Dugesia seclusa Dugesia semiglobosa Dugesia siamana Dugesia sicula Dugesia similis Dugesia sinensis Dugesia subtentaculata Dugesia superioris Dugesia tamilensis Dugesia tanganyikae Dugesia taurocaucasica Dugesia transcaucasica Dugesia tubqalis Dugesia tumida Dugesia uenorum Dugesia umbonata Dugesia venusta Dugesia verrucula Dugesia vestibularis Dugesia wytegrensis'' ,

References

External links

 
 

 
Rhabditophora genera